The Phoenix Singers were a trio of male African-American folk singers active in the early 1960s.  The members Ned Wright, Arthur Williams, and Roy Thompson were all former members of The Belafonte Folk Singers.

The trio was the musical guest on the first broadcast of The Tonight Show with Johnny Carson, October 1, 1962.

Carson wrote the liner notes for their first record album, The Phoenix Singers, issued by Warner Bros., WB1485, 1962.   Vocal arrangements and musical direction for this album was by Milt Okun.     Okun called The Phoenix Singers “one of my failure groups.” (Along the Cherry Lane, 2011, page 106.)

Their second and only other album, Warner Bros WB1522, was recorded live at The Shadows (later The Cellar Door), Georgetown, Washington, DC, entitled The Phoenix Singers in Concert.. The Phoenix Singers also appeared on at episodes of the TV show Hootenanny, as well as the Today show.

A few recordings from their albums have recently been added to YouTube.

The singers

Roy Thompson   (Leroy B. Thompson)
Bass.  Member of  The Belafonte Folk Singers, the Phoenix Singers and the Seafarers Chorus.  Born in Jamaica. Roy was a Phi Beta Kappa graduate from the City College of New York and went to Italy on a Buitoni Music Scholarship. As soloist with The Jubilee Singers, he toured Europe, Asia and North Africa under U.S. Sponsorship. Broadway audiences saw him in "To Late the Phalarope", "Carmen Jones", "Show Boat" and "Jamaica". Thompson wrote, arranged and recorded an album called "Ambassador of Calypso" (Request RLP8029). In early 1959 he joined the vocal quartet accompanying Harry Belafonte on his national tour.

Arthur Williams
Tenor/Baritone. From South Bend, Indiana. Attended Indiana University and the Juilliard School of Music, and was a winner of the National Negro Musicians Award. Williams appeared with Louis Armstrong on the Bell Telephone Hour and as a soloist with the Juilliard Orchestra and Chorus in the Mozart Requiem. He numbered among his credits Broadway appearances in "Show Boat", Carmen Jones", "Finian's Rainbow" and "Porgy and Bess". Member of The Belafonte Folk Singers and The Phoenix Singers. Appeared with Belafonte on many concerts over the years, notably heard as background voice in "Try To Remember".

Ned Wright
Tenor. Born in Ohio, educated at Oberlin College and the Juilliard School of Music. Wright studied religious music but made his Broadway debut singing with Katherine Dunham. Later he sang with the Metropolitan Opera Chorus and the Robert Shaw Chorale. Has also appeared in "Annie Get Your Gun" and "Finian's Rainbow" and on Broadway he was featured in "My Darlin' Aida" and "Four Saints in Three Acts". The latter was sent to Paris to represent the US at the World Congress of Music around 1960. As Robbins in "Porgy and Bess" he toured the United States, South America, Russia, 31 countries and five continents. In 1957 Wright joined Harry Belafonte and appeared with him at the Palace, on the Steve Allen Show, "The Bell Telephone Hour" and "Tonight with Belafonte". In the off-Broadway show "Simply Heavenly" he created the role of Watermelon Joe and also played it on Television's "Play of the Week". He also appeared in the film "Odds Against Tomorrow". Member of The Phoenix Singers and The Seafarers Chorus.  Vocals on Harry Belafonte's recordings of "Judy Drownded", "Lead Man Holler", "Love Love Alone", "Lucy's Door"

The albums

The Phoenix Singers "Warner Bros WB-1485"
 I'm the Man That Built the Bridges
 Lovely Choucoune
 Wicked Race
 Take Matty and Go
 Cotton Picking Song
 Wave to Me My Lady
 Little Rosie
 Song of the Land
 Run Come See
 The Jolly Swagman
 Unclouded Day
 Didn't It Rain

The Phoenix Singers in Concert "Warner Bros WB-1522"
 Music Train
 Oh Waly, Waly
 Joe Magaroc
 There Was A Time
 Lead Man Digger
 By & By / When the Morning Comes
 Hobo's Lullaby
 Ole Gator
 Diamonds of Dew
 Pocoman
 Goodnight Irene

References
 Sparks, Richard,  and Okun, Milt, (2011), Along the Cherry Lane: Tales from the Life of Music Industry Legend Milton Okun, Classical Music Today, LLC, Beverly Hills, CA
 Carson, Johnny,  (1962), Liner notes, on The Phoenix Singers, LP Record, Warner Bros.  1485.
 The Phoenix Singers. (1962). The Phoenix Singers,. [LP record]., Warner Bros.1485
 The Phoenix Singers. (1964 ?). The Phoenix Singers in Concert,. [LP record]., Warner Bros. 1522

American folk musical groups